Munirka is now an urban village in South Delhi, located near Jawaharlal Nehru University and Indian Institute of Technology Delhi campuses. Originally it was a jat and brahmins village of Tokas, Rathi and mudgal Gotra. Munirka villager's land was acquired by the government on which now exists RK Puram, JNU and parts of Vasant Kunj.
Its neighborhood consists of the Jawaharlal Nehru University campus on the south, Vasant vihar on the northwest, RK Puram on the northern side and the Indian Institute of Technology Delhi campus and Ber Sarai on south-eastern front. The outer ring road forms the north to the east boundary of this and also making it accessible. This is near flyover.

The notification for the urbanisation of Munirka was issued in March 1954, making it one of the earliest villages to be urbanised.

The nearest metro station is Munirka.

Migrants and population
Munirka has always been home to a large number of migrants. It has a very high population density for a small area. This derives from Munirka's proximity to Jawaharlal Nehru University, Rama Krishna Puram, Vasant Vihar Indian Institute of Technology and its location on the Outer Ring Road, which makes easy transport to and from many business centres of Delhi. One can find people from every single province in India here, and eateries and restaurants catering to their palette as well. There is a Korean church, a Sikh gurdwara, and a mosque other than the Baba Ganganath temple, which houses the patron deity of the village.

Architecture
It is a very old village—complete with a smattering of Lodi-era monuments—now absorbed by the relentless expansion of Delhi, which has both changed and threatened the very culture of the pre-urban communities of the Delhi region - Bramhin and Jat. There is a baoli (step well), a Lodi structure and a small Saiyid (a small mazaar-like shrine) of Sufi Saint called Ajirpur preserved by the Archaeological Survey of India in the park across the Outer Ring Road in RK Puram Sector-5. Elder residents of Munirka can still be found to offer a jot (incense on a stick; Hindi jyot), testifying to the syncretic cultural history of the region. This part of the village has given to the DDA sports complex, Vasant Kunj, Jawahar Lal University and the DTC Bus Depot. Further to the west Basant Lok and Vasant Vihar have been built on agrarian land which was acquired by the Delhi government from Munirka and Basant villages. To the north R.K. Puram has also been built on such land. One can see the Qutub Minar from parts of Munirka. It is also on the path of planes landing at the Delhi International Airport.

Historical sites

Notable people
Khajan Singh, Indian swimmer 
Rajat Tokas, Indian television actor
Narinder Tokas, President , Delhi University Students Union (DUSU)

References

Neighbourhoods in Delhi
Villages in South West Delhi district